Clive Emsley (4 August 1944 – 5 October 2020) was a British historian and criminologist.  He was a research director and lecturer at the Open University.

Biography

After his first degree at the University of York, where he was one of the initial intake of 150 undergraduates, he did research at Peterhouse, Cambridge, into the maintenance of public order in England during the French Revolution. At this point he had to make a career decision, having been a prominent member of the National Youth Theatre as an actor during his time at university. He played the part of Enobarbus (cf Rob Wilton's Theatricalia programme) in a celebrated production of 'Anthony and Cleopatra', with Helen Mirren as Cleopatra, and as a result  was offered professional roles.  However, he decided to stay in academia and refused the chance to become an actor though he kept his association with the National Youth Theatre during summer stints as an associate director, including 'Julius Caesar' which played in Germany in 1968.

He joined the Open University in 1970 as a lecturer, but was later a visiting fellow at Griffith University, Brisbane, Australia, where he advised on distance teaching (1983) and co-authored a teaching module (1996) which now forms part of a taught MA both at Griffith and the Open University.

He was visiting professor at the University of Paris VIII (Vincennes-St.Denis) (1983–1984) and at the University of Calgary, Alberta, Canada (1988 and 1990). He was elected president of the International Association for the History of Crime and Criminal Justice in 1995 and continued in the post. From October to November 2003 he was visiting professor at the University of Canterbury, Christchurch, New Zealand, and from September to December 2004, visiting research fellow at the Humanities Research Centre at the Australian University, Canberra.

He maintained a research interest in the revolutionary and Napoleonic era, but from the early 1980s onwards, his work focused primarily on the history of crime and policing. He co-directed the Old Bailey Proceedings Online project.

In 2000 he was awarded a D.Litt. by the Open University for his published work in the history of crime and policing. He was director of the European Centre for the Study of Policing, and co-director of the International Centre for Comparative Criminological Research.

Bibliography

Emsley, C. (2017)Theories and Origins of the Modern Police(First Edition). Routledge 

Crime and Society in England, 1750-1900, 1987, 1996, 2004
The English Police: A Political and Social History, 1991, 1996
Gendarmes and the State in Nineteenth-century Europe, 1999 
Britain and the French Revolution, 2000
Napoleon: Conquest, Reform and Reorganisation, 2003
Hard Men: Violence in England since 1750, 2005
Crime, Police and Penal Policy: European Experiences, 1750-1940, 2007
The Great British Bobby: A history of British policing from 1829 to the present, 2009
Soldier, Sailor, Beggarman, Thief, 2013

Book reviews

References

External links
 Biography, Open University Department of History
 Bibliography, European Centre for the Study of Policing (Open University)
 

British historians
1944 births
2020 deaths
Alumni of the University of York
Academics of the Open University
History Today people
National Youth Theatre members